Vasilyevka may refer to:
Vasilyevka, Azerbaijan, a village in Azerbaijan
Vasilyevka, name of several rural localities in Russia
Vasylivka, a town in Zaporizhia Oblast, Ukraine
 Vasilyevka, Kyrgyzstan, a village in Chuy Region, Kyrgyzstan